Challenge the Wild is a 1953 American wildlife documentary film written and directed by Frank A. Graham. The film was released on June 4, 1954, by United Artists.

Cast
George Graham as George Graham
Sheilah Graham as Mrs. George Graham

References

External links 
 

1954 films
American documentary films
1954 documentary films
United Artists films
Documentary films about nature
1950s English-language films
1950s American films